Igor Shumilov (born 20 October 1993) is a Belarusian football referee and former player. He retired from playing in 2020 and started refereeing in 2021.

References

External links

Profile at FC Minsk website

1993 births
Living people
Belarusian footballers
Association football defenders
FC Minsk players
FC Torpedo Minsk players
FC Rukh Brest players
Belarusian football referees